Ferredoxin reductase may refer to:

 Ferredoxin—NADP(+) reductase (FNR)
 Ferredoxin—NAD(+) reductase
 Ferredoxin—nitrite reductase
 Ferredoxin-thioredoxin reductase